Minnie Julia Riperton Rudolph (November 8, 1947 – July 12, 1979) was an American singer-songwriter best known for her 1975 single "Lovin' You" and her four octave  D3 to F7 coloratura soprano range. She is also widely known for her use of the whistle register and has been referred to by the media as the "Queen of the Whistle Register."

Born in 1947, Riperton grew up in Chicago's Bronzeville neighborhood on the South Side. As a child, she studied music, drama and dance at Chicago's Abraham Lincoln Center. In her teen years, she sang lead vocals for the Chicago-based girl group the Gems. Her early affiliation with the Chicago-based Chess Records afforded her the opportunity to sing backing vocals for various established artists such as Etta James, Fontella Bass, Ramsey Lewis, Bo Diddley, Chuck Berry and Muddy Waters. While at Chess, Riperton also sang lead for the psychedelic soul band Rotary Connection, from 1967 to 1971.

On April 5, 1975, Riperton reached the apex of her career with her No. 1 single "Lovin' You". The single was the last release from her 1974 gold album titled Perfect Angel. In January 1976, Riperton was diagnosed with breast cancer, and in April, she underwent a radical mastectomy. By the time of diagnosis, the cancer had metastasized and she was given about six months to live. Despite the prognosis, she continued recording and touring. She was one of the first celebrities to go public with a breast cancer diagnosis, but she did not disclose that she was terminally ill. In 1977, she became a spokesperson for the American Cancer Society. In 1978, she received the American Cancer Society's Courage Award, which was presented to her at the White House by President Jimmy Carter. Riperton died of breast cancer on July 12, 1979, at the age of 31.

Early life
Riperton was born in Chicago, the daughter of Thelma Inez (née Matthews) (1911–2005) and Daniel Webster Riperton (1898–1991), a Pullman porter. The youngest of eight children in a musical family, she embraced the arts early. Although she began with ballet and modern dance, her parents recognized her vocal and musical abilities and encouraged her to pursue music and voice. At Chicago's Abraham Lincoln Center, she received operatic vocal training from Marion Jeffery. She practiced breathing and phrasing, with particular emphasis on diction. Jeffery also trained Riperton to use her full range. While studying under Jeffery, she sang operettas and show tunes, in preparation for a career in opera. Jeffery was so convinced of her pupil's abilities that she strongly pushed her to further study the classics at Chicago's Junior Lyric Opera. The young Riperton was, however, becoming interested in soul, rhythm and blues, and rock. After graduating from Hyde Park High School (now Hyde Park Academy High School), she enrolled at Loop College, now named Harold Washington College, and became a member of Zeta Phi Beta sorority. She dropped out of college to pursue her music career.

Career

Early career
Riperton's first professional singing engagement was with The Gems, when she was 15. Raynard Miner, a blind pianist, heard her singing during her stint with Hyde Park's A Cappella Choir and became her musical patron. The Gems had relatively limited commercial success, but proved to be a good outlet for Riperton's talent. Eventually the group became a session group known as Studio Three and it was during this period that they provided the backing vocals on the classic 1965 Fontella Bass hit "Rescue Me". In 1964, The Gems released a local hit, I Can't Help Myself, and their last single, He Makes Me Feel So Good, was released in 1965. The Gems later released records under numerous names—most notably 1966's Baby I Want You by the Girls Three and 1967's My Baby's Real by the Starlets. The latter has achieved cult status with northern soul fans and remains a favorite. It was a Motown-style song reminiscent of Tammi Terrell. In 1968, Watered Down was released as a follow-up, under the name The Starlets. It was the last release of Riperton's former girl group. While a part of Studio Three, Riperton met her mentor, producer Billy Davis, who wrote her first local hit, "Lonely Girl", as well as its B-side, "You Gave Me Soul". In honor of Davis, she used the pseudonym Andrea Davis for the release of those two singles.

Rotary Connection

In 1966, some months after her Andrea Davis singles hit the radio, Riperton joined Rotary Connection, a funky rock-soul group creation of Marshall Chess, the son of Chess Records founder Leonard Chess. Rotary Connection consisted of Riperton, Chess, Judy Hauff, Sidney Barnes, and Charles Stepney. They released their debut album Rotary Connection in 1967 and, subsequently, five more albums: 1968's Aladdin and Christmas album Peace, Songs (1969),  Dinner Music (1970), and Hey Love (1971).

In 1969 Riperton, along with Rotary Connection, played in the first Catholic Rock Mass at the Liturgical Conference National Convention, Milwaukee Arena, Milwaukee, WI, produced by James F. Colaianni.

Come to My Garden
Riperton's debut solo album entitled Come to My Garden was produced, arranged, as well as orchestrated by her Rotary Connection band mate Charles Stepney and released in 1970 by GRT Records. Several of the songs were co-written by Stepney and Richard Rudolph, who married Riperton in August 1970. She was presented as a solo artist by Ramsey Lewis on Saturday, December 26, 1970, at Chicago's famed London House. Riperton went on to perform several numbers from the album while accompanied by Stepney. Although the record was not commercially successful at the time of its release, Come to My Garden is now acclaimed by music critics.

Perfect Angel and "Lovin' You"

In 1973, a college intern for Epic Records found Riperton in semi-retirement. She had become a homemaker and a mother of two in Gainesville, Florida. After he heard a demo of the song "Seeing You This Way", the rep took the tape to Don Ellis, VP of A&R for Epic. Riperton signed with Epic Records, and the family moved to Los Angeles, California. The subsequent record, Perfect Angel, turned out to be one of Riperton's best-selling albums. Included were the rock-soul anthem "Reasons"; the second single, "Take a Little Trip" (written by Stevie Wonder, who also coproduced the album); and the third single, "Seeing You This Way".
Sales of the album started out slow. Epic was ready to move on to the next record, but Rudolph convinced them to release another single. With the fourth single, "Lovin' You", the album caught on, and in April 1975, the song went to the top of the charts in the U.S. and 24 other countries. The song reached no. 2 in the UK Singles Chart, and number three on the U.S. R&B charts. It sold more than one million copies, and was awarded a gold disc by the RIAA in April 1975. Perfect Angel went gold and Riperton was finally revered as the "lady with the high voice and flowers in her hair." The album also featured the song "Every Time He Comes Around", with Deniece Williams singing the background vocals.

Later career
After Perfect Angel, Riperton and her husband, songwriter and music producer Richard Rudolph started on Riperton's third album, Adventures in Paradise (1975). Joe Sample of The Crusaders cowrote the title song, "Adventures in Paradise", and Crusaders producer Stewart Levine co-produced the album. While shooting a promotional clip for the album, she was attacked by a lion, but was not seriously injured. During an appearance on The Sammy Davis, Jr. Show, she played the footage of the incident for Sammy and her fellow guests, including Richard Pryor. The album was a modest success. Despite the R&B hit "Inside My Love" (a no. 5 U.S. R&B hit, later covered by Trina Broussard, Chanté Moore, and Delilah), the album did not match the success of Perfect Angel. Some radio stations refused to play "Inside My Love" due to the lyrics: "Will you come inside me?"

Her fourth album for Epic Records, titled Stay in Love (1977), featured another collaboration with Stevie Wonder in the funky disco tune "Stick Together".

In 1978, Richard Rudolph and Riperton's attorney Mike Rosenfeld orchestrated a move to Capitol Records for Riperton and her CBS Records catalog. In April 1979, Riperton released her fifth and final album, Minnie. "Memory Lane" was a hit from the album.

Collaborations
Riperton provided backing vocals on Stevie Wonder's songs "Creepin'" and "It Ain't No Use" from 1974's Fulfillingness' First Finale and "Ordinary Pain" from 1976's Songs in the Key of Life. In 1977, she lent her vocal abilities to a track named "Yesterday and Karma", on Osamu Kitajima's album, Osamu.

Personal life
Riperton was married to songwriter and music producer Richard Rudolph from August 1970 until her death in July 1979. Together, Riperton and Rudolph had two children; music engineer Marc Rudolph (born 1968), and actress and comedian Maya Rudolph (born 1972), a Saturday Night Live cast member from 2000 to 2007. Maya was a child when "Lovin' You" was recorded. According to the liner notes from Riperton's Petals compilation CD, the melody to "Lovin' You" was created as a distraction for Maya when she was a baby so that Riperton and Richard Rudolph could spend time together. Near the end of the unedited "Lovin' You", Riperton sings "Maya, Maya, Maya".

Illness and death

On August 24, 1976, Riperton revealed on The Tonight Show that she had undergone a mastectomy due to breast cancer. At the time of her diagnosis, Riperton found out her cancer had already spread to the lymphatic system, and she was given about six months to live. She continued touring in 1977 and 1978, and she became the national spokeswoman for the American Cancer Society's 1978–79 campaign. During the recording of her final album, Minnie, her cancer progressed to the point that she was in a great deal of pain. Extreme lymphedema immobilized her right arm in early 1979. In her final singing appearances on television (most notably on the Mike Douglas Show), her right arm remained in a fixed position during her performances. Near her death, in concert, she changed the end of "Lovin' You", "Maya, Maya, Maya" to "Maya, Maya, Ringo, Maya." Ringo was her nickname for her son, Marc.

By mid-June, Riperton was confined to bed. She entered Cedars-Sinai Medical Center in Los Angeles on July 10. On Thursday, July 12, 1979 at 10:00 am, she died in the arms of her husband. That Sunday, following a funeral service attended by more than five hundred mourners, Riperton was interred in the Westwood Village Memorial Park Cemetery in Los Angeles. Her epitaph is the opening line of her most famous song: "Lovin' you is easy 'cause you're beautiful".

Stevie Wonder paid tribute to Riperton during an episode of the TV show Soul Train, which aired shortly after her death in September 1979.  On June 7, 2009, TV One (US TV network's) Unsung series premièred a one-hour documentary on Riperton's career and life. It included interviews with her husband Richard, son Marc, daughter Maya, sister Sandra Riperton, and many others who worked with her.

Posthumous releases
After Riperton died, several artists contributed vocals to tracks she had recorded before her death, to help compile Richard Rudolph's final tribute to his wife, Love Lives Forever. Included, among others, were Peabo Bryson, Michael Jackson, and Stevie Wonder. Riperton's last single, "Give Me Time," was released in 1980. Richard Rudolph wrote the song, "Now That I Have You" for her, but she never got the chance to record it; he gave the song to Teena Marie, who recorded it (and co-produced it with Rudolph) on Marie's second LP, Lady T. Finally, in 1981, Capitol Records released The Best of Minnie Riperton, a greatest hits collection. The "new" song on the album was a remake of Joni Mitchell's "A Woman of Heart and Mind," which was a holdover from the Minnie sessions. Also included were an alternate mix of "Memory Lane"; live versions of "Can You Feel What I'm Saying," "Lover And Friend," and "Young, Willing, and Able"; and two "Moments with Minnie." It also included the hits "Perfect Angel," "Lovin' You," "Inside My Love," "Adventures In Paradise," and two tracks from Love Lives Forever: the single "Here We Go" (a duet with Peabo Bryson), and the song "You Take My Breath Away." During the 1990s, Riperton's music was sampled by rap and hip-hop artists including Tupac Shakur, Dr. Dre, A Tribe Called Quest, Blumentopf, the Orb and Tragedy Khadafi.

Vocal ability
Riperton had a coloratura soprano vocal range. Aside from her various hits, she is perhaps best remembered today for her ability to sing in high head voice (occasionally the whistle register which is often mistakenly confused with the former), in which she had rare facility. She is known as The Nightingale, and a Songbird. Her rare ability to enunciate in the high registers set her apart from most other whistle-register singers. This feature is most notably heard in the song "Here We Go" (a duet with Peabo Bryson), where she sings "here we go" in the whistle register. Whistle-register enunciation can also be heard in songs such as "Inside My Love", "Adventures in Paradise", "Expecting", "Only When I'm Dreaming", and also in "Teach Me How to Fly" and "Like a Rolling Stone" with the Rotary Connection.

Riperton was also noted for her ability to sound almost mechanical or instrumental in the high head voice and whistle. In "You Take My Breath Away", she sang a portamento ending two octaves above the staff. She has also been credited for her ability to sustain notes in the sixth and seventh octave for long periods, as in "Reasons", "Could It Be I'm in Love", "Adventures in Paradise", and "Inside My Love", and also "Love Me Now" with the Rotary Connection. Having an innate ability to imitate many instruments helped lead to Riperton's discovery while she was a secretary at Chess Records.

In her recordings, Riperton's highest recorded note reached in the whistle register was F7 on the third scale of "You Take My Breath Away". Riperton reached this extremely high note before on an early recording of "Teach Me How to Fly" and "Could It Be I'm in Love". Also in a live performance of the song "Ruby Tuesday" from Rotary Connection, she sang an F7. In the song "Lovin' You" she sings a walkdown on the A major scale from F6 to A5. Mariah Carey cited Riperton as an influence on her.

Discography

Studio albums

Compilation albums

Singles

Accolades

Grammy Awards
The Grammy Awards are awarded annually by the National Academy of Recording Arts and Sciences. Riperton received a sum of two Grammy nominations.

Tours
 George & Minnie Live! (1976–77)

Riperton joined with established jazz guitarist George Benson, to kick-off a co-headlining North American concert tour. The tour ran from 1976 through the fall of 1977.

Set list

Notes
On select dates during the tour, Riperton's performance of her hit song "Lovin' You" included a reprise version that featured George Benson.
Riperton performed "Can You Feel What I'm Saying?" only at select dates during the tour.

Dates

 Not all North American dates are listed.

References

External links

1947 births
1979 deaths
20th-century African-American women singers
20th-century American singers
20th-century American women singers
African-American songwriters
American jazz singers
American rhythm and blues singer-songwriters
American sopranos
American soul singers
Ballad musicians
Burials at Westwood Village Memorial Park Cemetery
Capitol Records artists
Deaths from breast cancer
Deaths from cancer in California
Epic Records artists
Hyde Park Academy High School alumni
Singer-songwriters from California
Singer-songwriters from Illinois
Singers from Chicago
Singers from Los Angeles
Singers with a four-octave vocal range
The Raelettes members